Wild Target is a 2010 black comedy film directed by Jonathan Lynn and starring Bill Nighy, Emily Blunt, Rupert Grint, Eileen Atkins, Martin Freeman, and Rupert Everett. It is based on the 1993 French film. Lucinda Coxon wrote the screenplay, and it was produced by Martin Pope and Michael Rose.

Production began shooting in London on 16 September 2008. Filming also took place on the Isle of Man.

Plot
Victor Maynard (Bill Nighy) is a reclusive hit-man perpetuating a family line of professional assassins. His father, a well-known assassin, is deceased, but he operates under the constant watchful gaze of his domineering mother, Louisa (Eileen Atkins), who wants him to preserve the family reputation.

Rose (Emily Blunt) is an ingenious con artist, who manages to sell a fake Rembrandt, painted by her friend in the Restoration Department of the National Gallery, to Ferguson (Rupert Everett), a billionaire, for £900,000. Ferguson responds by hiring Victor to assassinate her. Victor takes the contract, but misses several opportunities to kill her, finally giving up the attempt entirely as he falls in love with his intended victim.

Thwarting another assassin's attempt to kill Rose, Victor encounters Tony (Rupert Grint), an apparently homeless young man, who is thrown into the already complex lives of Victor and Rose. For a while Victor mistakenly wonders if he is sexually attracted to Tony, but later adopts the young man as a protégé and apprentice in the assassination business.

Ferguson, still determined to have his revenge, hires Dixon (Martin Freeman), reputed to be second only to Victor Maynard in proficiency, to kill both Rose and Victor. While staying at a luxurious hotel to hide from Ferguson's men, the trio are discovered and Ferguson chases them in the street, resulting in a car crash where Ferguson becomes grievously  injured, and the trio successfully escapes. The action moves from London to the Maynard family home deep in the English countryside, where the farce genre of the film becomes centerpiece, as Louisa Maynard returns to the house, and Dixon (with a henchman) also discovers the location.

Louisa comes for help and dispatching one of Dixon's henchman but Dixon whips out Victor's father's Mauser gun to kill Victor but the gun turns out to be a booby trap, which ends up firing backward due to a clogged barrel, killing Dixon. Victor and Rose bury the two assassins.

Three years later, Victor and Rose are married and have a son named Angel. While eating lunch outside their house, Tony comes out and asks where the family cat is; and Victor sees that his son has killed and buried the cat discreetly. Victor proudly smiles at his son, realizing that his son has what it takes to be his successor.

Cast
 Bill Nighy as Victor Maynard: A middle aged hit man who is hired by Ferguson to kill Rose after she cons Ferguson out of £900,000. After purposely missing an opportunity to shoot Rose, Ferguson sends his henchmen to do the deed. Victor kills one henchman and injures another when he is looking for Rose and, concealing his true profession, helps her escape with the help of local slacker, Tony. He adopts Tony as his apprentice and Victor realises he's fallen in love with Rose.
 Emily Blunt as Rose: A confident con artist who oversteps the mark when she cons Ferguson out of £900,000 and leaves him with a convincing copy of a Rembrandt self-portrait. Realizing the danger she is in, she stays with Victor and Tony in an attempt to escape her attempted assassination. Her adventurous lifestyle takes a turn when she realises her enjoyment of Victor's company.
 Rupert Grint as Tony: A young man who witnesses Victor shooting Ferguson's bodyguard and decides to stay with Victor for safety. Victor employs him as an apprentice (with Tony thinking Victor is a private detective and later, upon learning Victor is a hit man, taking it in stride) and he soon realizes he has a 'killer instinct'.
 Eileen Atkins as Louisa Maynard: Victor's intimidating mother who, while impressed with his profession, is concerned as to what will happen to the family business.
 Rupert Everett as Ferguson: A London gangster who hires Victor to kill Rose.
 Martin Freeman as Hector Dixon: A sadistic assassin who plays second-fiddle to Victor Maynard. While influenced by Victor, Dixon jumps at the opportunity given to him by Ferguson to dispose of the greatest hit-man ever known.
 Gregor Fisher as Mike: Ferguson's incompetent henchman whose several attempts to kill Victor, Rose, and Tony leave him in hospital with one ear.
 Geoff Bell as Fabian: Dixon's dull-witted partner.

Reception
The site's critics' consensus reads "An ineptly staged farce that dishonors the original film and squanders the comedic potential of its fine actors." Metacritic gives the film a weighted average score of 41 out of 100, based on reviews from 13 critics, indicating "mixed or average reviews".

Timeout London only giving it two out of five stars, saying that it feels like nothing has been "thought through." The verdict given by Empire online is equally negative; it says that the "talented cast keep some low-key action and tired gags from derailing this disappointing farce".

Other critics enjoyed the film, with Flick Filosopher saying "Movies hardly ever make me laugh out loud, but this one did, more than once, with its unpredictable twists... and unexpected punchlines growing out of the deliciously twisted characters".

References

External links
 
 
 
 

French black comedy films
2010s English-language films
British black comedy films
Films shot in London
2010 black comedy films
2010 films
Films directed by Jonathan Lynn
Films about contract killing in the United Kingdom
British remakes of French films
2010s British films
2010s French films